Carlos Alves Júnior, better known as Carlos Alves (10 October 1903, in Lisbon – 12 November 1970), was a Portuguese footballer, who played as central defender. He became famous for his black gloves, later used by his grandson, João Alves.

International career 

Alves had 18 caps for Portugal, 13 for Carcavelinhos and 5 for Académico do Porto. Alves made his debut at 8 January 1928 against Spain in a 2–2 draw in Lisbon. He was a member of the Portugal squad at the 1928 Football Olympic Tournament and played in all of the National Team 3 games in the tournament. His last game was at 2 April 1933, in a 0–3 loss to Spain, in Vigo, in a friendly match, aged 29 years old.

References

External links 
 
 

1903 births
1970 deaths
Portugal international footballers
Portuguese footballers
Primeira Liga players
Olympic footballers of Portugal
Footballers at the 1928 Summer Olympics
Footballers from Lisbon
Association football defenders